Miłość w czasach popkultury (Love in the Time of Pop Culture) is the fourth album by Polish alternative rock band Myslovitz. The album helped to establish the band's position as the most popular rock band in Poland.

Track listing
All songs written by Artur Rojek, Wojtek Kuderski, Jacek Kuderski, Wojtek Powaga and Przemek Myszor
"Chłopcy" (Boys) – 3:58
"Nienawiść" (Hatred)– 3:50
"Długość dźwięku samotności" (The Length of the Sound of Solitude) – 4:12
"Dla Ciebie" (For You) – 3:47
"Peggy Sue nie wyszła za mąż" (Peggy Sue didn't get married) – 4:27
"Gdzieś" (Somewhere) – 4:33
"Kraków" (Cracow) – 4:10
"Miłość w czasach popkultury" (Love in Times of Popular Culture) – 3:16
"Noc" (Night) – 5:51
"Alexander" – 4:01 
"My" (Us)– 3:28
"Zamiana" (Exchange) – 6:26

Personnel
Artur Rojek – vocals, guitar
Wojtek Kuderski – drums
Jacek Kuderski - bass guitar
Wojtek Powaga - guitar
Przemek Myszor - guitar

External links 

1999 albums
Myslovitz albums